UFC 163: Aldo vs. Korean Zombie was a mixed martial arts event held on August 3, 2013, at the HSBC Arena in Rio De Janeiro, Brazil.

Background
The main event was expected to feature current UFC Featherweight Champion, José Aldo taking on future UFC Lightweight Champion, Anthony Pettis.  However, in mid-June Pettis pulled out of the bout citing a knee injury and was replaced by Chan Sung Jung.

Josh Koscheck was expected to face Demian Maia at the event.  However, Koscheck was forced out of the bout with an injury and as a result, Maia was pulled from the card as well.

Promotional newcomer Robert Drysdale was expected to face Ednaldo Oliveira at the event.  However, Drysdale pulled out of the bout in mid-July citing a lingering staph infection. Oliveira faced UFC newcomer Francimar Barroso at the event.

Phil Harris was expected to face John Lineker at the event.  However, Harris was forced out of the bout and Lineker faced promotional newcomer José Maria Tomé.

Clint Hester was expected to face Cezar Ferreira at the event.  However, Hester was forced out of the bout with an injury and was replaced by Thiago Santos.

Brian Stann co-commentated the card with Mike Goldberg due to a prior commitment for Joe Rogan.

John Lineker missed the 126 pound weight limit for a flyweight non-title fight, weighing in at 129 pounds.  As a result, he surrendered 20 percent of his purse to his opponent, José Maria Tomé, and the bout took place as a 129-pound catchweight fight.

Results

Bonus awards
The following fighters were awarded $50,000 bonuses.

 Fight of The Night: Ian McCall vs. Iliarde Santos
 Knockout of The Night: Anthony Perosh
 Submission of the Night: Sérgio Moraes

See also
List of UFC events
2013 in UFC

References

http://www.sherdog.com/events/UFC-163-Aldo-vs-Pettis-28015

Ultimate Fighting Championship events
2013 in mixed martial arts
Mixed martial arts in Brazil
International sports competitions in Rio de Janeiro (city)
2013 in Brazilian sport